Oxford Township is one of the twenty-two townships of Tuscarawas County, Ohio, United States.  The 2000 census found 5,133 people in the township, 1,125 of whom lived in the unincorporated portions of the township.

Geography
Located in the southwestern corner of the county, it borders the following townships:
Salem Township - north
Washington Township - east
Monroe Township, Guernsey County - southeast corner
Wheeling Township, Guernsey County - south
Oxford Township, Coshocton County - west
Adams Township, Coshocton County - northwest corner

The village of Newcomerstown is located in northern Oxford Township.

Name and history
It is one of six Oxford Townships statewide.

Government
The township is governed by a three-member board of trustees, who are elected in November of odd-numbered years to a four-year term beginning on the following January 1. Two are elected in the year after the presidential election and one is elected in the year before it. There is also an elected township fiscal officer, who serves a four-year term beginning on April 1 of the year after the election, which is held in November of the year before the presidential election. Vacancies in the fiscal officership or on the board of trustees are filled by the remaining trustees.  The current trustees are Richard Casteel, James McDonnell and Larry Stein, and the fiscal officer is Laura Brown.

References

External links
County website

Townships in Tuscarawas County, Ohio
Townships in Ohio